Cárdenas is a municipality in the Rivas department of Nicaragua, located on the southwestern shore of Lake Nicaragua.

In 2002, the municipality of Cárdenas had threatened the government in Managua with secession and becoming part of Costa Rica. Costa Rica claimed that it would respect Nicaraguan territory and had no intention of annexing the municipality. 

Municipalities of the Rivas Department